The Groover! is an album by jazz organist Richard "Groove" Holmes which was recorded in 1968 and released on the Prestige label.

Reception

Allmusic awarded the album 3 stars stating "Holmes acquits himself well, if with few surprises, on this trio session".

Track listing 
 "Speak Low" (Ogden Nash, Kurt Weill) - 7:02  
 "My Scenery" (Freeman) - 4:05 
 "The Walrus" (George Freeman) - 8:20  
 "Blue Moon" (Lorenz Hart, Richard Rodgers) - 5:05  
 "I'll Remember April" (Gene de Paul, Patricia Johnston, Don Raye) - 6:15  
 "Just Friends" (John Klenner, Sam M. Lewis) - 5:35

Personnel 
Richard "Groove" Holmes - organ
George Freeman (tracks 1-4), Earl Maddox (tracks 5 & 6) - guitar
Billy Jackson - drums

References 

Richard Holmes (organist) albums
1968 albums
Prestige Records albums
Albums recorded at Van Gelder Studio
Albums produced by Cal Lampley